San José de Chiquitos Airport ,  is an airport serving the town of San José de Chiquitos in the Santa Cruz Department of Bolivia. The runway is on the north edge of the town.

See also

Transport in Bolivia
List of airports in Bolivia

References

External links 
OpenStreetMap – San José de Chiquitos
OurAirports – San José de Chiquitos
SkyVector – San José de Chiquitos
Fallingrain – San José de Chiquitos Airport

Airports in Santa Cruz Department (Bolivia)